Estellah Fils Rabetsara (born 29 May 1994) is a swimmer that competed for Madagascar at the 2012 Summer Olympics. She competed in the Women's 100m freestyle event where she ranked at #44 with a time of 1:01.11. She did not advance to the semifinal. Rabetsara competed in the same event in 2012.

References 

1994 births
Malagasy female swimmers
Olympic swimmers of Madagascar
Swimmers at the 2012 Summer Olympics
Swimmers at the 2016 Summer Olympics
Living people
Malagasy female freestyle swimmers
People from Antsirabe